The Matheson Trust is an educational charity based in London dedicated to further and disseminate the study of comparative religion, especially from the point of view of the underlying harmony of the major religious and philosophical traditions of the world.

History 

The Matheson Trust was established in London in 1974 by Donald Macleod Matheson CBE (1896-1979), who in addition to his work as a civil servant was active as a translator of Perennialist works, most notably Understanding Islam by Frithjof Schuon and An Introduction to Sufi Doctrine by Titus Burckhardt.

Registered as a UK charity in 1982, the trust was for years active sponsoring academic research, lectures, film production and publications. In January 2011 a new series of paperback publications was launched, the Matheson Monographs, and a public website went online hosting the Matheson Library.

Matheson Trust associates have included, among others, Martin Lings, Charles Le Gai Eaton, William Stoddart and Reza Shah-Kazemi.

Matheson Monographs 

Since 2008, The Matheson Trust had been co-producing publications with a number of kindred organisations and established publishers: The Prometheus Trust, Fons Vitae (KY), Archetype UK, but December 2010 saw the launch of an independent series, the "Matheson Monographs", covering "scriptural exegesis, the modalities of spiritual and contemplative life, studies of particular religious traditions, comparative analyses, studies of traditional arts, crafts and cosmological sciences, contemporary scholarly expositions of religious philosophy and metaphysics, translations of both classical and contemporary texts and transcriptions of lectures by, and interviews with, spiritual and scholarly authorities from different religious and philosophical traditions".

Matheson Library 

In March 2011 the Matheson Trust website was launched, hosting an online library of free selected books and articles, almost exclusively in English, including authors and sources as varied as Shaykh Abdallah Bin Bayyah, the Archbishop of Canterbury Rowan Williams, the Berzin archives, Charles, Prince of Wales, Chief Rabbi Jonathan Sacks, James Cutsinger, Gavin D'Costa, Seyyed Hossein Nasr, Harry Oldmeadow, the journal Sacred Web, Huston Smith, Timothy Winter (Shaykh Abdal Hakim Murad), The Woolf Institute of Abrahamic Faiths and others. Documents are free to browse and download, most in PDF format, with a few articles in HTML.

As of December 2021, there are approximately 750 holdings in the library, a quarter of which are audio recordings.

Audio Library 

One of the purported aims of the Matheson Library is to use existing contemporary media technologies to make available resources from ancient traditions, either in the form of recitation of traditional scriptures or in the scholarly transmission of the doctrines and insights pertaining to the different religions. An ongoing hear! project is converting scholarly texts and other texts of interest into MP3 format, and making them available through the Audio section of the library. In April 2012 the Matheson Trust Sacred Audio Collection was launched, a repository of selected liturgical audio recordings from the major religious traditions. This collection includes live recordings from temples and ritual gatherings around the world.

Publications
Christianity & Islam: Essays on Ontology and Archetype, by Samuel Zinner, 2010.  
The Living Palm Tree: Parables, Stories, and Teachings from the Kabbalah, by Mario Satz, translated by Juan Acevedo, 2010.  
Louis Massignon: The Vow and the Oath, by Patrick Laude, translated by Edin Q. Lohja, 2011.  
The Gospel of Thomas: In the Light of Early Jewish, Christian and Islamic Esoteric Trajectories, by Samuel Zinner, 2011.  
Sacred Royalty: From The Pharaoh to The Most Christian King, by Jean Hani, translated by Gustavo Polit, 2011.  
Ascent to Heaven in Islamic and Jewish Mysticism, by Algis Uždavinys, 2011.  
Orpheus and the Roots of Platonism, by Algis Uždavinys, 2011. 
Enduring Utterance: Collected Talks, by Martin Lings, 2015. 
Primordial Meditation, by Frithjof Schuon, translated by Angela Schwartz and Gillian Harris, 2015. 
Weighing the Word, by Peter Samsel, 2016. 
Breaking the Spell of the New Atheism in the Light of Perennial Wisdom, by Gustavo Polit, 2017. 
The Queen and the Avatar, by Dominique Wohlschlag, 2017. 
The Great War of the Dark Age: Keys to the Mahabharata, by Dominique Wohlschlag, 2019. 
Imam ‘Ali From Concise History to Timeless Mystery, by Reza Shah-Kazemi, 2019.

See also

Institutions and initiatives

Scholars and authors

Notes

External links 

Ten Thousand Films
Gai Eaton’s website

Book publishing companies of the United Kingdom
Discipline-oriented digital libraries
Educational charities based in the United Kingdom
Religious charities based in the United Kingdom
Religious studies
Traditionalist School
British digital libraries